Mussorgsky can refer to:

The Mussorgsky family of Russian nobility;
Modest Mussorgsky, a Russian composer belonging to that family.
Mussorgsky (film), a 1950 Soviet film about the composer

Mussorgskij
 Mussorgskij (crater) - crater on Mercury